Southampton Parish is one of the nine parishes of Bermuda. It is named for Henry Wriothesley, 3rd Earl of Southampton (1573-1624).

It is located in the southwest of the island chain, occupying all of the western part of the main island, except for the westernmost tip (which is part of Sandys Parish). It includes the chain's southernmost point, and its north coast comprises much of the coast of the Little Sound (an arm of the  Great Sound, the large expanse of water which dominates the geography of western Bermuda). in the east it is joined to Warwick Parish. As with most of Bermuda's parishes, it covers just over 2.3 square miles (about 6.0 km2 or 1500 acres). It had a population of 6,421 in 2016.

Natural features in Southampton include Whale Bay, Church Bay, Horseshoe Bay, and Riddell's Bay.

Other notable features of Southampton include the Whale Bay Fort, and Gibbs Hill Lighthouse, which stands on the chain's highest point.

Education
Schools in the parish:
 Southampton Preschool 
 Heron Bay Primary School
 Port Royal Primary School
 Dalton E. Tucker Primary School
 Bermuda Institute (private school)
Hotels
The Reefs Resort and Club
Coral Beach Tennis Club

Sports
Southampton Rangers football club play their home games at the Southampton Oval.

References

External links
Bermuda Online

 
Parishes of Bermuda